Ștefan Constantin Berariu (born 14 January 1999) is a Romanian rower. Competing in coxless fours he won silver medals at the 2020 Summer Olympics, 2021 European Championships and 2019 World Rowing Championships  and Gold medal at the 2019 European Rowing U23 Championships, 2020 European Rowing U23 Championships and 2021 European Rowing U23 Championships.

References

External links
 
 
 
 

1999 births
Living people
Romanian male rowers
World Rowing Championships medalists for Romania
Rowers at the 2020 Summer Olympics
Olympic rowers of Romania
Olympic medalists in rowing
Olympic silver medalists for Romania
Medalists at the 2020 Summer Olympics
Sportspeople from Suceava
21st-century Romanian people